Motley Slough Bridge is a small bridge designated a Mississippi Landmark and on the U.S. National Register of Historic Places, located in Lowndes County, Mississippi. It is a single span iron Pratt pony truss bridge built in 1920. It "embodies the distinctive characteristics of a type, period or method of construction.".

The bridge is located about 1/4 mile southwest of US Route 45 on Shaeffers Chapel Road. The eastern approach is overseen by the Motley Slough Dragon. Recent construction on US 45 involves rerouting that section of Shaeffers Chapel Road.

References

External links 
 MDA&H Historic Resources Fact Sheet (with link to original application as a historic location) 
 

Road bridges on the National Register of Historic Places in Mississippi
National Register of Historic Places in Lowndes County, Mississippi
Pratt truss bridges in the United States
Iron bridges in the United States